Phil Hankinson (July 26, 1951 – November 19, 1996) was an American basketball player. He was born in Augusta, Georgia.

Hankinson attended what is now Great Neck North High School in Great Neck, New York, where he scored 28.7 points and pulled down 17 rebounds per game in 1968–69, his senior year.

A 6'8" forward, Hankinson played at the University of Pennsylvania from 1970 to 1973.  He participated on three Ivy League championship teams that reached the NCAA Tournament, and he was named team MVP in 1973.

After college, Hankinson was selected by the Boston Celtics in the second round of the NBA Draft.  He appeared in two seasons with the Celtics before a knee injury ended his playing career.  Hankinson held NBA career averages of 3.9 points per game and 1.8 rebounds per game.  He also won an NBA championship ring with the Celtics in 1974.

In November 1996, Hankinson was found shot in his car in Kentucky, the victim of an apparent suicide. His father said that Hankinson had suffered from depression ever since his injury occurred.

Notes 

1951 births
1996 suicides
American men's basketball players
Basketball players from New York (state)
Boston Celtics draft picks
Boston Celtics players
Great Neck North High School alumni
Penn Quakers men's basketball players
People from Great Neck, New York
Small forwards
Basketball players from Augusta, Georgia
Sportspeople from Nassau County, New York
Suicides by firearm in Kentucky